"Apeman" is a 1970 song by the English rock band the Kinks. It was written by Ray Davies and appears on the album Lola Versus Powerman and the Moneygoround, Part One.

Background
"Apeman", alongside many other songs from the Lola vs. Powerman album, was written by Ray Davies during a family trip to Cornwall in July 1970.  In the song, Davies is fed up with the modern world and declares that he wants to "sail away to a distant shore and make like an apeman". He also expresses how man created our problems and, given half a chance, he would leave the cities and traffic to live in the jungle. It reflects the nostalgia expressed on the albums Lola vs. Powerman and The Kinks Are the Village Green Preservation Society.

It is performed in the calypso genre, a style Davies first explored with "I'm on an Island" (1965).

Single release
"Apeman" was released as a single in the fall of 1970, with a B-side of the Dave Davies composition "Rats". While it did not do as well on the US Pop Singles chart as its predecessor "Lola" did, only reaching number 45, it was a major hit in the UK, peaking at number five in the singles chart, their last Top 10 entry in their home country. It was also the band's Top 10 hit in Australia, where it reached number nine.

Due to publishing issues the band was experiencing at the time, the British edition of the single was published under "Copyright Control", a term used when no publisher is assigned.

Controversy and re-dubbing
The Kinks provoked some controversy, because in the line "...the air pollution is a-foggin' up my eyes...", the word "a-foggin'" sounded too much like "a-fucking". Like the band's previous single "Lola", where Ray Davies had to change "Coca-Cola" to "cherry cola", he again had to fly back to London to re-record this line, dubbing over with a more clear "a-foggin'" 	prior to its single release, in turn causing a delay in the US single release of the tune. The original lyric remains intact on the album, and is heard at 2:20. On their performance on Top of the Pops, filmed later in November, the changed lyric can be heard on the backing tape.

Promo video
A colour promo video made for the song was filmed at Hampstead Heath, the same location used for the cover picture of the album The Kinks Are the Village Green Preservation Society. The video featured the band's newly recruited pianist John Gosling dressed up as an ape. The Kinks guitarist Dave Davies said of this, "It was [manager] Grenville [Collins] who thought we should use a piano and keyboards. So John Gosling joined thinking that, 'Hey man, I've hit it big!' We very quickly brought him down to earth. He was Lola for that song and then an ape [for 'Apeman']."

Reception
Upon release in Britain, the NME called the song "a very commercial disc with an irresistible hook chorus". Record Mirror said: "As ever, Ray [Davies] has something to say. As ever The Kinks do a thoroughly professional, style-changing job." After its US release, Billboard praised the song as "an easy-beat calypso rocker with a clever lyric."

In 2018, The Telegraph named "Apeman" as the second-greatest song by Ray Davies and the Kinks, calling it "Ostensibly a satire on hippy culture [...] Although the reggae-infused piano on the track is still delicious more than 40 years later, the combination of Ray Davies's faux-Caribbean accent and his 'apeman' references are not exactly politically correct these days."

Personnel
According to band researcher Doug Hinman:

Ray Davieslead vocal, guitar
Dave Daviesbacking vocal; acoustic and electric guitars
John Daltonbass guitar
Mick Avorydrums
John Goslingbaby grand piano, electric piano

Chart performance

Cover versions and usage in popular culture
"Apeman" is featured in the 2004 film Mondovino, the 1986 films Club Paradise starring Robin Williams (although it's a different mix than the album, more Caribbean to fit the movie), and Link starring Terence Stamp. It was used in the first episode of the comedy television series The Last Man on Earth to show the lead character's descent into a primitive style of living once civilization has ended.

"Apeman" was covered by British singer and teenage heartthrob Jack Wild on his 1971 album Everything's Coming Up Roses, by the Esso Trinidad Steel Band in 1971 on their self-titled album, by Fish for his 1993 album Songs from the Mirror and by the Format, who included it on their 2007 album B-Sides & Rarities.

In 1989, "Apeman" appeared in a UK television advertisement for Ski yoghurts, with re-written lyrics announcing "I Like A Ski, Man".

In keeping with the theme, drawings have also been made of an ape-man, as by the artist Marc Engelhard in 2019. In addition, there are films from Hollywood, Los Angeles like The Ape Man or Return of the Ape Man about this form of a species.

Notes

References

Sources

 
 

The Kinks songs
1970 singles
Songs written by Ray Davies
Song recordings produced by Ray Davies
2006 singles
Pye Records singles
1970 songs
Reprise Records singles
Satirical songs
Songs about primates
Calypso songs